The Colonial Secretary of Van Diemen's Land (later Colonial Secretary of Tasmania) was the representative of the British Colonial Office in Van Diemen's Land (later Tasmania), and was usually appointed from Britain.
In 1884, the role was renamed Chief Secretary.

List of colonial secretaries of Van Diemen's Land/Tasmania

The following is an incomplete list of colonial secretaries of Van Diemen's Land/Tasmania:

Colonial secretaries of Van Diemen's Land

Colonial secretaries of Tasmania

References

Colonial history of Tasmania
Colonial Secretary